Gruner may refer to:

People 
 Dov Gruner (1912–1947), Jewish Zionist leader
 Eduard Gruner, Swiss engineer 
 Elioth Gruner (1882–1939), Australian painter
 Gottlieb Sigmund Gruner (1717–1778), Swiss cartographer and geologist
 Klaus Gruner (born 1952), German handball player
 Nicholas Gruner (1942–2015), Canadian priest 
 Olivier Gruner (born 1960), French kickboxer
 Paul Gruner (1869–1957), Swiss physicist 
 Peter Gruner, professional wrestler known as Billy Kidman
 Silvia Gruner (born 1959), Mexican artist 
 Sybille Gruner (born 1969), German handball player
 Walther Gruner (1905–1979), German-born British singing teacher
 Werner Gruner (1904–1995), German engineer

Other
Grüner Veltliner, known in the United States sometimes as simply Gruner
Grüner (restaurant), a restaurant in Portland, Oregon

See also 
 Grüner (disambiguation)

German toponymic surnames